Busway may refer to:

Transport technology 
 Bus rapid transit, bus systems including some elements of light railways or metro systems
 Guided busway, concrete tracks exclusively for modified buses
 Bus lane, a lane reserved for buses and in some cases for taxis as well

Transport systems 
 Cambridgeshire Guided Busway in the United Kingdom
 In Brisbane, Australia:
 Eastern Busway
 Northern Busway
 South-East Busway
 The Luton to Dunstable Busway in the United Kingdom
 Nantes Busway in France
 Trans-Val-de-Marne in southern suburb of Paris, France
 Guided busway in Essen
 In Auckland, New Zealand:
 Northern Busway
 Eastern Busway
 O-Bahn Busway in Adelaide, Australia
 a system of roads only for buses in Runcorn, England
 South Miami-Dade Busway in Miami, United States
 In Pittsburgh, United States
 West Busway
 South Busway
 Martin Luther King Jr. East Busway
 In Los Angeles, United States
 El Monte Busway
 Harbor Transitway
 Ottawa Rapid Transit in Ottawa, Canada
 Metroway operates a portion of its route on a dedicated busway in Northern Virginia, United States
 TransJakarta in Jakarta, Indonesia, some people also called it as Busway

Transport companies
Busways Travel Services, a defunct English bus company
Busways, an Australian bus company

Similar terms 
 Bus duct,  a sheet metal duct containing either copper or aluminium busbars (in electrical distribution system)